is a Japanese archaeologist who claimed he had found a large number of stone artifacts dating back to the Lower Paleolithic and Middle Paleolithic periods. These objects were later revealed to be forgeries.

Success
Fujimura was born in Kami, Miyagi, in 1950. After graduating from a high school in Sendai, he obtained a job in a manufacturing company. He became intrigued by archaeology when he was a child, finding shards of Jōmon pottery in the backyard of his house.

In 1972 Fujimura began to study archaeology and to look for Paleolithic artifacts during his holidays. Within the few years to follow, he rose to fame among amateur and academic archaeologists in Sendai by which he was appointed the head of the NGO group, Sekki Bunka Kenkyukai(石器文化硏究会, literally translated to stone tool culture research association) in 1975. Fujimura discovered and excavated many Paleolithic stone artifacts in Miyagi prefecture, such as at Zazaragi site in 1981, Nakamine C site in 1983 and Babadan A site in 1984. From a cross-dating investigation of the stratum these stone tools were estimated to be about 50,000 years old.

He established his reputation as a leading amateur archaeologist because he found most of the artifacts on his own. He even became known as the archaeologist with the "divine hands".

After this success, he participated in 180 archaeological digs in northern Japan and almost always found artifacts, their age becoming increasingly older. Based on his discoveries the history of the Japanese Paleolithic period was extended to about 300,000 years. Most of the archaeologists did not question Fujimura's work and this discovery was written in the history textbooks. Later he gained a position as a deputy director at the private NGO group Tohoku Paleolithic Institute.

Criticism
Despite the acquiescence from the archeologists, some geologists and anthropologists claimed the discovery was dubious and lacked consistency with the geologic analysis of the sites.

Takeoka Toshiki at the Kyoritsu Joshi University published an article

Shizuo Oda and Charles T. Keally also mentioned some peculiarities in their article

Disclosure
On October 23, 2000, Fujimura and his team announced that they had another finding at the Kamitakamori site near Tsukidate town. The finds were estimated to be 570,000 years old.

On November 5, 2000, the newspaper Mainichi Shimbun published pictures of Fujimura digging holes and burying the artifacts his team later found. The pictures had been taken one day before the finding was announced. Fujimura admitted his forgery in an interview with the newspaper.

Fujimura confessed and apologized the same day in a press conference. He said that he had been "possessed by an uncontrollable urge". He had planted the artifacts from his own collection in strata that would have indicated earlier dates. In Kamitakamori he had planted 61 of 65 artifacts, and had earlier planted all of the stonework in the Soshin Fudozaka site in Hokkaidō. He claimed that these were the only times he had planted artifacts.

The Japanese Archaeological Association disaffiliated Fujimura from its members. A special investigation team of the Association revealed that almost all the artifacts which he had found were his fabrication.

See also
 Japanese Paleolithic hoax
 Piltdown Man
 Beringer's Lying Stones

References

External links
Japanese Archeology, Web page by C. T. Keally
前・中期旧石器問題関連文書総覧, 日本考古学協会

1950 births
Archaeological forgery
People involved in scientific misconduct incidents
Living people
Hoaxes in Japan
Paleolithic Japan